Robert Byington Mitchell (April 4, 1823January 26, 1882) was a brigadier general in the Union Army during the American Civil War and the Governor of the New Mexico Territory from 1866 to 1869.

Early life and career
Mitchell was born on April 4, 1823, in Mansfield, Ohio. For some odd reason, it was recorded that he graduated from both Kenyon College and Washington College, although neither school has a record of his attendance.

He studied law in Mount Vernon, Ohio. After completing his studies, he practiced law in Mansfield. He served in the Mexican War as a second lieutenant in the 2nd Ohio Volunteers. He was elected mayor of Mount Gilead, Ohio, in 1855. Next year, he moved to Linn County, Kansas Territory. He served in the territorial legislature, as a delegate to the Leavenworth Convention, from 1857 to 1858. He served as treasurer of the Kansas Territory from 1859 to 1861. He was a delegate to the 1860 Democratic National Convention in Charleston, South Carolina.

Civil War service
After the start of the Civil War, Mitchell served as  the Adjutant General of Kansas from May 2, 1861, to June 20, 1861. He later led the 2nd Kansas Infantry. He was badly wounded at the Battle of Wilson's Creek on August 10, 1861. He was shot from his horse while leading his regiment.

After recovery, U.S. President Abraham Lincoln appointed him as a brigadier general to rank from April 8, 1862, and he was given command of a mixed brigade at Fort Riley. He commanded the 9th Division in Charles C. Gilbert's III Corps at the Battle of Perryville. He was then sent to Nashville, Tennessee, where he remained for several months.

During the Chickamauga campaign, Mitchell served as George H. Thomas's Chief of Cavalry for the Army of the Cumberland. Just before the Third Battle of Chattanooga, he was ordered to Washington, D.C., for court-martial duty. According to some sources, this was due to severe wounds which incapacitated him from field duty but this is contradicted in the Official Records by Mitchell's own correspondence. Whether incapacitated or not, he would not see active campaigning again, and for the remainder of the Civil War, he commanded the District of Nebraska, then the District of North Kansas, and finally the District of Kansas. He saw service in Colorado Territory in January 1865, following the Indian raid on Julesburg, Colorado, on the Overland Trail, but he did not succeed in locating the Indian camp on the Republican River until after they had departed.

Governor of New Mexico Territory
Mitchell was honorably mustered out of the army on January 15, 1866. On the same day, the United States Senate confirmed his nomination as the Governor of the New Mexico Territory. He took the oath of office on June 6, 1866. He never appeared to take his duties as governor seriously. He was often absent from the territorial capital Santa Fe, without explanation, forcing the legislature to forward bills it had passed to Washington, D.C., for approval of the United States Congress. He resigned as governor in 1869.

Later life
After leaving the office, Mitchell returned to Kansas. He was unsuccessful in his bid to represent Kansas in the U.S. Congress in 1872. He then moved to Washington, D. C., where he died on January 26, 1882. He was buried with full military honors in Section 2, Grave 1023, of Arlington National Cemetery in Arlington, Virginia.

See also

 List of American Civil War generals (Union)

References

External links
 
 
 

1823 births
1882 deaths
Governors of New Mexico Territory
Politicians from Mansfield, Ohio
Union Army generals
People from Linn County, Kansas
People of Ohio in the American Civil War
People of Kansas in the American Civil War
Ohio lawyers
Kansas Democrats
American military personnel of the Mexican–American War
Burials at Arlington National Cemetery
People from Mount Gilead, Ohio
New Mexico Democrats
19th-century American politicians
19th-century American lawyers